

January–April

May–August

September–December

Expired artists in Pashto cinema

References
  

2017 in Pakistani cinema
2017
Pashto